Gamma-enolase, also known as enolase 2 (ENO2) or neuron specific enolase (NSE), is an enzyme that in humans is encoded by the ENO2 gene. Gamma-enolase is a phosphopyruvate hydratase.

Gamma-enolase is one of the three enolase isoenzymes found in mammals. This isoenzyme, a homodimer, is found in mature neurons and cells of neuronal origin. A switch from alpha enolase to gamma enolase occurs in neural tissue during development in rats and primates.

Interactive pathway map

Utility

Detection of NSE with antibodies can be used to identify neuronal cells and cells with neuroendocrine differentiation. NSE is produced by small-cell carcinomas, which are neuroendocrine in origin.  NSE is therefore a useful tumor marker for distinguishing small-cell carcinomas from other tumors.

References

Further reading

External links 
 

EC 4.2.1
Diagnostic neurology